Gadzowice  is a small village located in Poland, in the Opole Voivodeship, Głubczyce County and Gmina Głubczyce.

References

Villages in Głubczyce County